Robert McClellan Adamson (21 May 1914 – 1995) was a Scottish professional footballer who played as a left half for a number of British clubs.

Adamson was born in Balbeggie; he played for Hearts and Dundee before moving to Welsh side Wrexham. After switching to English side Carlisle United, Adamson moved north to Dundee United. It is unknown where Adamson went immediately after leaving United at the beginning of the 1942–43 season, although he also played for East Fife at some point.

Adamson's son-in-law is Tommy Campbell, former Arbroath manager and current youth coach of St Johnstone.

References

1914 births
1995 deaths
Association football wing halves
Scottish footballers
Heart of Midlothian F.C. players
Dundee F.C. players
Wrexham A.F.C. players
Carlisle United F.C. players
Dundee United F.C. players
East Fife F.C. players
Scottish Football League players
English Football League players
Association football goalkeepers